Bergish is a collective name for a group of West Germanic dialects spoken in the Bergisches Land region east of the Rhine in western Germany. The name is commonly used among its speakers, but is not of much linguistic relevance, because the varieties belong to several quite distinct groups inside the continental West Germanic dialect continuum. As usual inside a dialect continuum, neighbouring varieties have a high degree mutual intelligibility and share many similarities while the two more distant ones may be completely mutually unintelligible and considerably different. Therefore, speakers usually perceive the differences in their immediate neighbourhood as merely dialectal oddities of an otherwise larger, solid group or language that they are all part of, such as "Bergish". Bergish is itself commonly classified as a form of "Rhinelandic", which in turn is part of German. Bergish in a strict sense is the eastmost part of the Limburgish language group, which extends far beyond the rivers Rhine and Maas into the Netherlands and Belgium. Bergish in a strict sense is located in the North West. It combines Low Franconian properties with some 
Ripuarian properties and is seen as a transitory dialect between them in the dialect continuum of Dutch and German.
The Bergish varieties in the northern areas are also referred to as parts of Meuse-Rhenish, which exclusively refers to the Low Franconian varieties, that are Limburgish including Bergish. 

In the south of Bergish is the Benrath line, border to the Ripuarian variety Upper Bergish or East Ripuarian.  Bergish is also seen as part of Meuse-Rhenish, which names a somewhat larger number of dialects than the three groups having names with Bergish.

As opposed to linguists, laymen sometimes call their local Bergisch variety simply Low Bergish or "Platt" (:de:Platt); they do not distinguish between the dialect groups, when talking about local languages. People from outside the Rhineland often make even less distinctions and use the term Rhinelandic for the vernacular of an even larger region than Meuse-Rhenish. The Bergish dialects were called only "Bergish" by early dialect geographers of Germany of the 19th century. 

Some dialect geographers, e.g. Dr. Georg Cornelissen use the term East Bergish for a quite small part of not only 
Bergish in the north-east. It combines features of the Limburgish (predominantly), the Westphalian group and the South Guelderish (Zuid-Gelders or Cleverlands) group. Zuid-Gelders covers much of the Lower Rhine area in Germany and extends into the Central Netherlands. It is a Low Franconian group, whereas Westphalian belongs to the Low German group. "Bergish" varieties in a broader sense  belong to another group following some dialect geographers of today South Bergish, or Upper Bergish, varieties are part of the Ripuarian group, where they form the East Ripuarian subgroup.  Contrasting the Bergish groups in a strict sense, Ripuarian Bergish varieties belong to the Middle German group, and thus are High German varieties, together with for example Austro-Bavarian and Swiss German, among many others.

Bergish-speaking localities 
The following is a list of settlements where a variant of Bergish is or used to be spoken:
Peter Wiesinger: Strukturelle historische Dialektologie des Deutschen: Strukturhistorische und strukturgeographische Studien zur Vokalentwicklung deutscher Dialekte. Edited by Franz Patocka, 2017, p. 341ff.,  349f. is where Wiesinger presents
the view of Erich Mengel (1967), places with a view of Mengel presented there by Wiesinger in brackets:

 Hilden (Westbergische Mundarten), Erkrath (Westbergische Mundarten), Mettmann (Niederbergische Mundarten), Gruiten (Niederbergische Mundarten), Wülfrath (Niederbergische Mundarten)
 Cronenberg, Wuppertal (Kernbergische Mundarten), Remscheid (Kernbergische Mundarten), 
Ronsdorf (Kernbergische Mundarten) 
 Solingen with Höhscheid, Gräfrath, Wald and Ohligs as well as Haan (Mittelbergische Mundarten)
 Heiligenhaus (Niederbergische Mundarten), Velbert (Niederbergische Mundarten), 
Neviges (Niederbergische Mundarten), Vohwinkel (Niederbergische Mundarten) 
 Werden, Essen (Nördliche nordbergische Mundarten) 
 Elberfeld (Südliche nordbergische Mundarten), Barmen (Südliche nordbergische Mundarten)

Remscheid is also classified as South Low Franconian and hence Low Franconian.

Localities not speaking Bergish 
The following is a list of settlements which are described as not speaking a Bergish dialect:

Low Rhenish-speaking  
Hamborn
Meiderich
Ruhrort
Sterkrade

Ripuarian-speaking  
Düsseldorf-Benrath
Dhünn (Wermelskirchen)
Wermelskirchen

Westphalian-speaking  
Beyenburg
Byfang
These are also called nördliche nordbergische Mundarten:
Langenberg (Rhineland)
These are also called ostbergische Mundarten:
Lennep
Lüttringhausen
Hückeswagen

References

Literature 
 Georg Wenker: Das rheinische Platt. 1877.
 Das rheinische Platt, (Sammlung deutsche Dialektgeographie Heft 8), Marburg, 1915.
 Georg Cornelissen, Peter Honnen, Fritz Langensiepen (editors): Das rheinische Platt. Eine Bestandsaufnahme. Handbuch der rheinischen Mundarten Teil 1: Texte. Rheinland-Verlag, Köln. 1989. 
 Gustav Hermann Halbach: Bergischer Sprachschatz – Volkskundliches plattdeutsches Remscheider Wörterbuch. Remscheid 1951

Kernbergische Mundarten:
 Erich Leihener: „Cronenburger Wörterbuch“ (Deutsche Dialektgeographie, Band 2) Marburg 1908
 August Diesdrichs: Beitrag zu einem Wörterbuch der Remscheider Mundart. Remscheid, 1910.

Mittelbergische Mundarten:
 F. W. Oligschläger: Wörterbuch der Solinger Volkssprache
 Rudolf Picard: Solinger Sprachschatz, Wörterbuch und sprachwissenschaftliche Beiträge zur Solinger Mundart, Duisburg, 1974.

Niederbergische Mundarten:
 Hermann Bredtmann: Die Velberter Mundart. Ein kurzer Abriß der Laut- und Formenlehre nebst einem Wörterverzeichnis. Wuppertal, 1938.
 Dr. Hermann Bredtmann: Die Velberter Mundart. Wuppertal-Elberfeld, 1938

Südliche nordbergische Mundarten:
 Bruno Buchrücker: Wörterbuch der Elberfelder Mundart nebst Abriß der Formenlehre und Sprachproben. [Wuppertal-] Elberfeld, 1910.
 Julius Leithäuser: Wörterbuch der Barmer Mundarten nebst dem Abriß der Sprachlehre. [Wuppertal-] Elberfeld, 1929.
 Nachträge zum Barmer Wörterbuch. Wuppertal-Elberfeld, 1936.

Low Franconian languages
German dialects
Bergisches Land
Limburgish language
North Rhine-Westphalia